The 1915 Yukon general election was held on March 4 to elect the ten members of the Yukon Territorial Council. The members were chosen from five different electoral districts with the two most popular winning seats Plurality block voting.

Members elected

References

1915
1915 elections in Canada
Election
March 1915 events